Nezir Sağır (born October 19, 1983 in Isperih, Bulgaria) is a Turkish weightlifter competing in the –85 kg division.

Early years
He was born in Bulgaria to parents of Turkish ethnicity. The family emigrated in 1989, to Turkey,  settled first in the Batıkent neighborhood of Yenimahalle, Ankara,  and moved later to Pursaklar, Ankara. He began in 1994, with weightlifting in Pursaklar. Nezir Sağır is the older brother of Olympic, world and European weightlifting champion Taner Sağır.

Sports career
He participated at the 2012 Summer Olympics. He was included into the Turkish Olympics team as a placeholder after European champion in the -85 kg division. Fatih Baydar tested positive in a doping check made on July 3, of which result was notified on July 23, shortly before the departure of the Turkish athletes to London.

At the 2013 Mediterranean Games held in Mersin, Turkey, he won the silver medal in the –85 kg Clean&Jerk division.

Sağır took the silver medal in the -85 kg division at the 2013 Islamic Solidarity Games in Palembang, Indonesia.

References

External links
International Weightlifting Federation Start List Men's -85kg

1983 births
People from Isperih
Bulgarian Turks in Turkey
Bulgarian emigrants to Turkey
Living people
Turkish male weightlifters
Olympic weightlifters of Turkey
Weightlifters at the 2012 Summer Olympics

Mediterranean Games silver medalists for Turkey
Competitors at the 2013 Mediterranean Games
Mediterranean Games medalists in weightlifting
Www.bangbros.com